Fudaishi (Japanese; Chinese 傅大士 Fù Dà Shì, also known as Shanhui, Fuxi, Shuanglin dashi, and Dongyang dashi) (497 – 569) was a Chinese Buddhist monk who was later deified as the Japanese patron deity of libraries. He is often represented alongside his sons, Fuwaku and Fukon.

Fudaishi hailed from Dongyang during the Northern and Southern Qi dynasties. Da shi (大士), lit. 'great scholar', was used in China as a rendering of the Sanskrit mahāsattva. He is sometimes referred to in translations as 'Mahāsattva Fu'. In addition to the invention of the library system, Fudaishi was credited with overseeing the construction of the Shunaglin Temple and compiling an early version of the Chinese Buddhist Canon. He is credited as the author of the Jingang borejing laisong (金剛般若經來頌, Taisho no. 2732), a commentary on the Diamond Sutra.

Fudaishi is noted for his "lecture" on the Diamond Sutra, recorded in the Hekiganroku (Record of the Blue Cliffs). According to this account, Fudaishi was invited to speak by the Emperor Bu-tei. He stepped up to the lectern, struck it a blow with his staff, and then returned to his seat without speaking a word.

He is regarded as in incarnation of Miroku, the Waiting Buddha.

Works in Translation

References

497 births
569 deaths
Chinese Buddhist monks
Japanese deities